Wakamba! is a 1955 American docudrama film which takes place in Kenya.  It is a dramatized presentation of some of the social customs of the Bantu people, as represented through a young native hunter, Tandu. Narrated by Paul E. Prentiss, the film was a co-production of the American Museum of Natural History and Jarville Studios, and was released by RKO Radio Pictures on June 29, 1955.

See also
List of American films of 1955

References

External links

American documentary films
1955 documentary films
1955 films
1950s English-language films
1950s American films